The 2009 Trofeo Bellaveglia was a professional tennis tournament played on outdoor red clay courts. This was the first edition of the tournament which was part of the 2009 ATP Challenger Tour. It took place in Orbetello, Italy between 20 July and 26 July 2009.

Singles entrants

Seeds

 Rankings are as of July 13, 2009.

Other entrants
The following players received wildcards into the singles main draw:
  Thomas Fabbiano
  Federico Gaio
  Andrey Kuznetsov
  Gianluca Naso

The following players received a special exempt into the main draw:
  Daniele Bracciali
  Oleksandr Dolgopolov Jr.

The following players received entry from the qualifying draw:
  Manuel Jorquera
  Louk Sorensen
  João Sousa
  Adrian Ungur

Champions

Singles

 Oleksandr Dolgopolov Jr. def.  Pablo Andújar, 6–4, 6–2

Doubles

 Paolo Lorenzi /  Giancarlo Petrazzuolo def.  Alessio di Mauro /  Manuel Jorquera, 7–6(5), 3–6, [10–6]

References
Official Site

Trofeo Bellaveglia
Clay court tennis tournaments
Orbetello Challenger